Ferdinand Quentin Dulcken (1837–1901) was an English composer and pianist.

Dulcken was born 1 June 1837, the son of pianist  (the sister of Ferdinand David) and Theobald Dulcken.

He moved to Astoria, Queens in 1876. He died in 1901 probably in Astoria.

While in the United States he toured with Julie Rivé-King and was the director of her troupe for a time.

References

External links

1837 births
1901 deaths
English classical pianists
American classical pianists
English classical composers
American male pianists
19th-century American male musicians